Šlapanov is a municipality and village in Havlíčkův Brod District in the Vysočina Region of the Czech Republic. It has about 800 inhabitants.

Administrative parts
Villages of Kněžská and Šachotín are administrative parts of Šlapanov.

References

Villages in Havlíčkův Brod District